Av Oss, For Oss (By Us, for Us in Norwegian) is the sixth full-length album by the Norwegian Viking metal band Einherjer, released on October 27, 2014 through Indie Recordings.

Track listing

Credits
Gerhard Storesund - Drums, Keyboards, synthesizer
Frode Glesnes - Guitars, Bass, Vocals
Aksel Herløe - Guitars

References

Einherjer albums
2014 albums